Shweta Gautam is an Indian television actress.

Filmography

Television

References

External links
 

Actresses from Mumbai
Indian soap opera actresses
Indian television actresses
Living people
People from Mumbai
21st-century Indian actresses
Actresses in Hindi television
Year of birth missing (living people)